Boelen is a surname. Notable people with the surname include:

Femke Boelen (born 1968), Dutch rower
Henricus Boelen (1697–1755), American silversmith
Herman Boelen (born 1939), Dutch rower
Jacob Boelen (c.1657–1729), American silversmith
Jan Boelen (born 1967), Belgian designer

See also
Boelens